Kutai Kartanegara Regency (abbreviated as Kukar) is a regency of East Kalimantan province, Indonesia. It has a land area of 27,263.10 km2 and a water area of 4,097 km2, geographically located between 1°18′40″S and 116°31′36″E. The population of the regency was 626,286 at the 2010 Census and 729,382 at the 2020 Census; the official estimate as at mid 2021 was 733,626. The town of Tenggarong is the capital of the regency.

In 2019, President Joko Widodo proclaimed that the new national capital of Indonesia will be built in an area partly in the Kutai Kartanegara Regency and partly in the adjacent Penajam North Paser Regency, and that the construction process will set off around 2024.

History

Kutai Kartanegara Regency lies in the historical region of Kutai, home to the first and oldest Hindu kingdom of Indonesia, the Kutai Martadipura Kingdom founded in the 4th century CE by king Kudungga.

Administrative districts 
Kutai Kartanegara Regency is divided into twenty districts (kecamatan), tabulated below with their areas and their populations at the 2010 Census  and 2020 Census, together with the official estimates as at mid 2021. The newly formed West Kota Bangun and West Samboja districts were split from Kota Bangun and Samboja on 5 March 2021.

The table also includes the locations of the district administrative centres, the number of villages in each district (totalling 44 urban kelurahan and 193 rural desa) and its post code(s).

Notes: (a) comprising 19 urban kelurahan and 4 rural desa. (b) including 14 offshore islands. (c) all kelurahan. (d) including one offshore island. (e) including offshore island of Pulau Kumala. (f) comprising 12 urban kelurahan and 2 rural desa. (g) including offshore island of Pulau Yupa. (h) including 32 offshore islands. (j) except desa of Sidomulyo, which has a post code of 76131. (k) including 6 offshore islands.

Bukit Bangkirai rainforest

Bukit Bangkirai (Bangkirai Hill) is a 1,500-hectare natural tropical located about 58 kilometres (around 45 minutes by car) from the city of  Balikpapan.  Plants of the family Dipterocarpaceae dominate in the area, especially Bangkirai trees  (Shorea laevis of the genus Shorea) growing to 40–50 metres in height. There are over 120 bird species as well as gibbons (Müller's Bornean gibbon), macaque monkeys (Southern pig-tailed macaques, Crab-eating macaques), Maroon leaf monkeys, Banded pigs, and Banggai crows.  Black Orchids (Coelogyne pandurata), among 45 kinds of orchids, are endemic to Bukit Bangkirai.

To visit the forest, visitors can walk along a 64-metre canopy bridge which connects five big Bangkirai trees 30 metres above the ground.

Mangrove information, research center
East Kalimantan province has developed an 18-hectare plot of land for mangrove information and research center in Sepatin village, in Anggana District, as Bali has done. It will functioning as a research, exhibition, information, breeding as well as education center on mangroves, especially in the Mahakam Delta.

Smart City
In early 2015 it was announced that part of Kutai Kartanegara Regency had been selected to be a trial 'smart city', the first in Indonesia, based on the Fujisawa Sustainable Smart Town (SST) concept.  The aim of the SST concept was to reduce  emissions by 70 percent and reduce consumption of water by 30 percent. The Kutai Kartanegara area was chosen as a trial area because of good investment growth in the region, the extensive area, relatively moderate levels of population density, effective planning in the area, and rich energy resources.

See also 
 Kutai, (historical region in eastern Borneo)
 Kutainese language
 Legend of the Centipede Lake

References

External links